Aabeni was an ancient Egyptian official with the title high steward. He was one of the most important officials at the royal court in the early Thirteenth Dynasty.

Attestations
Aabeni is known from a number of monuments.

Papyrus Boulaq 18
His most important attestation is in the Papyrus Boulaq 18. This papyrus is an account of the Theban palace dating to the Thirteenth Dynasty where he appears in several lists of officials. The exact dating of Papyrus Boulaq 18 is dispute in Egyptology, A queen Aya is metioned there.  therefore it remains open under which king Aabni served, but in the papyrus also appears the vizier Ankhu.

Abydos
At Abydos, Aabeni is also known from a weight found and a stela.

See other contemporaries
Ankhu (vizier)
Aya (queen)

References 

Officials of the Thirteenth Dynasty of Egypt
Ancient Egyptian high stewards